Mozhaev or Mozhayev is a Russian masculine surname, its feminine counterpart is Mozhaeva or Mozhayeva. It may refer to

 Aleksandr Mozhayev (born 1958), Russian fencer
Alexei Mozhaev (1918–1994), Russian painter, graphic artist and art teacher
Boris Mozhayev (1923–1996), Russian author, dramatist, script-writer and editor
Sergey Mozhaev (born 1988), Russian freestyle skier

Russian-language surnames